Parimal Mitra Smriti Mahavidyalaya, established in 1985, is general degree college in Malbazar. It is in Jalpaiguri district. It offers undergraduate courses in arts and commerce. It is affiliated to  University of North Bengal.

Departments

Arts and Commerce

Bengali
English
Nepali
History
Political Science
Philosophy
Economics
Hindi
Sociology
Geography
Commerce

Accreditation
The college is recognized by the University Grants Commission (UGC).

See also

References

External links
Parimal Mitra Smriti Mahavidyalaya
University of North Bengal
University Grants Commission
National Assessment and Accreditation Council

Universities and colleges in Jalpaiguri district
Colleges affiliated to University of North Bengal
Educational institutions established in 1985
1985 establishments in West Bengal